Dothiorella ulmi is a fungal plant pathogen that causes die-back of elm. It was first identified in 1929 on American elm (Ulmus americana) and was thought to belong to the order Sphaeropsidales but was later described as Cephalosporium sp. before formally being identified as Dothiorella ulmi in 1937.

References

External links
 USDA ARS Fungal Database

Fungal tree pathogens and diseases
ulmii
Fungi described in 1937